Black Market Music is the third studio album by British alternative rock band Placebo. The album took nine months to record, from late-1999 to mid-2000; the longest that the band had ever spent recording an album until 2022’s Never Let Me Go. It was released on 9 October 2000 by record label Hut.

Four singles were released from the album: "Taste in Men", "Slave to the Wage", "Special K" and "Black-Eyed". The album reached number 6 in the UK Albums Chart, and received a generally favourable reaction from music critics.

Background and content

Speaking to Kerrang! in June 2009, Brian Molko remembered: We had a real swagger and bravado when we went into the studio for this one. We had just come off a really successful tour and felt we'd really exploded. We felt like cowboys of rock! We were also really heavily medicated and beginning to get quite deep into drugs. That's probably why it took nine months to make an album. The drugs also contributed to a certain amount of arrogance. At least that's what I remember from the time. I think we had a desire to write about the world we saw around us. We thought it was cool that, though other people were a little afraid to get deep down and dirty, we could take it on ourselves to write about those things. I think that album was the start of us trying to mix genres. We had so much hatred for rap-rock bands like Limp Bizkit and all they represented – misogyny, homophobia and commercialism – that we wanted to do our own version of it.

The album is dedicated to music publicist Scott Piering, who died of cancer in early 2000. The song "Commercial for Levi" is a reference to the sound technician Levi Tecofski, who on one occasion saved frontman Brian Molko's life: Molko, drunk and about to cross the road, was quickly pulled back by Tecofski from the path of an approaching vehicle.

Release

Black Market Music was released on 9 October 2000. It reached number 6 in the UK Albums Chart.

Reception

Black Market Music received a generally favourable critical response, though a less enthusiastic reception than previous records. Dean Carlson of AllMusic wrote that "Black Market Music finds Molko in such moody lust that his strangled, androgynous wailing rivals anything the band has previously flashed to the world [...] Placebo seem to have finally found that sweet wet spot between beauty and perversion." Dale Price of Drowned in Sound called it "a heavily revised upgrade of their back catalogue. And then some." Nicholas Taylor of PopMatters called it "highly listenable dark guitar rock".

Among its detractors were NME, who called it "a case of ambition eclipsing talent, of hubris, of a band losing the plot. Placebo's frame of reference has always been narrow, but they've now been reduced to empty gestures without any visionary tunes to tip the balance."

Brian Molko ranked this as his least favourite Placebo album.

Track listing

Personnel
Placebo
Brian Molko – vocals, guitar, keyboards, 6-string bass, production, mixing
Stefan Olsdal – bass, guitar, 6-string bass, keyboards, backing vocals, production, mixing
Steve Hewitt – drums, percussion, production, mixing

Additional personnel
Rob Ellis – string arrangements
Bill Lloyd – bass on "Peeping Tom"
Severe Loren – backing vocals on "Taste in Men" and "Special K"
Dimitri Tikovoï – string programming
Justin Warfield – rapping vocals on "Spite & Malice"

Technical
Paul Collins – sleeve art direction
Ian Cooper – mastering
Paul Corkett – production, mixing
Lorraine Francis – engineering
Scott Kannberg – sampling
Dare Mason – production
Kevin Westenberg – sleeve art direction, sleeve photography

Charts

Weekly charts

Year-end charts

Certifications

References

External links

2000 albums
Placebo (band) albums
Hut Records albums
Virgin Records albums